My Stepmother Is an Alien is a 1988 American science fiction comedy film directed by Richard Benjamin. It stars Dan Aykroyd, Kim Basinger, Jon Lovitz, and Alyson Hannigan. The film follows the story of Celeste, an extraterrestrial woman who is sent on a secret mission to Earth, after her home planet's gravity is mistakenly disrupted by Steven Mills, a widowed scientist raising his daughter Jessie as a single father.

The screenplay was written by Herschel Weingrod, Timothy Harris, and Jonathan Reynolds, based on an earlier script by Jericho Stone. Stone had originally pitched the film to Paramount Pictures as a drama that would serve as an allegory for child abuse. When Paramount optioned the story, they suggested that it would be more believable as a comedy. The film was unproduced for four years until Weintraub Entertainment Group put it into production in 1988.

My Stepmother Is an Alien was a box-office bomb, grossing only $13.8 million against a $19 million budget. The film also received negative reviews from critics, with most of the responses panning the film's humor and screenplay. Basinger and costar Lovitz received generally favorable reviews for their comedic performances, but in a New York Times review, Aykroyd was singled out for criticism for his performance as a romantic lead.

Plot
Steven Mills is a widowed scientist working on different ways to send radio waves into deep space. After he sends a radio wave out of the galaxy, it hits a planet (Cosine N to the 8th), causing a disruption of gravity on the planet. Celeste is sent to investigate who could have done it and how it was done, believing it was an attack. She is aided by a device called Bag: an alien tentacle with a single eye and a mind of its own disguised as a designer purse. Bag is able to create any object, such as diamonds and designer dresses, almost instantaneously. Celeste crashes a party hosted by Steven's brother, Ron, and immediately draws attention to herself by making outdated references to TV shows and political slogans under the mistaken belief that they are current (information that had actually taken 92 years to get from Earth to her home world).

Celeste's inexperience almost results in her exposing herself as alien as she struggles with simple tasks such as cooking and trying to kiss for the first time. She goes home with Steven and spends the night (after Bag teaches her what sex is, which she greatly enjoys). Jessie, Steven's 13-year-old daughter, is at first happy that her father has found someone (her mother having died five years previously), but becomes suspicious when she observes Celeste eating the acid out of batteries and pulling eggs out of boiling hot water with her bare hands. However, she cannot convince her smitten father that something is unusual about Celeste. When Celeste tells him that she must leave in 24 hours, he impulsively proposes, and she accepts. Ron also has his doubts about Celeste and tries to dissuade Steven from marrying her on the idea she is an illegal immigrant or planning economic espionage, but then admits he is just jealous his brother has found his dream girl, whereas he will never find a girl like Princess Stéphanie of Monaco.

Celeste begins enjoying life as a human as she encounters new experiences such as sneezing and love. When Jessie finally confronts her about being an extraterrestrial, Celeste admits her home world has no emotion and that she plans to depart once she gets Steven to recreate the radio signal and send it (which she says will reverse the gravity problems on her world). However, she begins to question her decisions when Jessie says it will devastate her father, for whom Celeste has now developed feelings. After Jessie argues with Steven, she runs away and is nearly hit by a car but is saved by Celeste, revealing her powers. Steven accepts that Celeste is indeed an alien and that she has fallen in love with him and sees Jessie as her own daughter. He further ingratiates her to human society by showing her how to eat real food.

Steven figures out how to recreate the radio wave and saves Celeste's planet. Bag, however, had been sent to Earth to destroy it and eliminate the danger to Celeste's world entirely. After throwing Bag into the power field of the wave transmitter (destroying Bag), the leaders of Celeste's home world report in and tell her to finish Bag's job. Steven and Celeste manage to convince them it was an accident, not an act of aggression, and that Earth has many benefits that require further studying. They accept the explanation and demand that Celeste return to explain human culture to them. Not wanting to leave, Celeste negotiates having a native of Earth become an ambassador to their world as a token of goodwill. Ron is selected and accepts; he departs for Celeste's world in a spaceship served by several flight attendants, all of whom look like Princess Stéphanie.

Cast

Production

Development and writing
Screenwriter Jericho Stone developed the story under the working title They’re Coming as a drama, an allegory about child abuse. He pitched this version of the story to Paramount Pictures in 1981. Paramount agreed to option the story and paid him to write the screenplay, but felt it would be more believable as a comedy. On June 20, 1984, Variety reported that Catalina Production Group was planning to start principal photography on They're Coming in late 1984 for Paramount, naming the screenwriters as Stone and Richard Benner; actresses considered for the lead by Paramount included Bette Midler, Shelley Long, Julie Andrews and Raquel Welch. Subsequently, the production moved to 20th Century Fox, which hired Herschel Weingrod and Timothy Harris to rewrite the screenplay. Fox considered Cybill Shepherd and Joan Rivers for the role, but ultimately never produced the film, and it went into turnaround to Weintraub Entertainment Group, where the title was changed to Two Kids.

Director Richard Benjamin read an unfinished version of the screenplay in the early 1980s, but did not become interested in the project until reading a completed draft he received via Weintraub in 1987, and agreed to direct. From Benjamin's recollection, Stone's original screenplay resembled a horror film. By 1988, the screenplay had received further rewriting by Jonathan Reynolds. Stone was ultimately credited only for the story, under his first name, Jericho. The film went into principal photography on February 29, 1988, and wrapped in May of that year; the total cost of production and marketing was reported as $26 million, with $19 million representing the production costs. Some scenes were filmed at Van Nuys High School and Anaheim Stadium.

Don Correia served as the choreographer for My Stepmother Is an Alien. Micaela Esdra dubbed for Kim Basinger in Italian while Choi Seong-woo dubbed for Basinger for South Korean audiences.

Music
The soundtrack album was released by Polydor Records.

 Room to Move - Animotion (4:12)
 Not Just Another Girl - Ivan Neville (4:05)
 Be the One - Jackie Jackson (4:15)
 I Like the World - Cameo (6:11)
 One Good Lover - Siren (3:51)
 Hot Wives - Dan Aykroyd (2:53)
 Pump Up the Volume - M.A.R.R.S. (4:06)
 Enjoy - Alan Silvestri (2:54)
 The Klystron - Alan Silvestri (5:33)
 The Celeste - Alan Silvestri (4:56)
 Kiss - Art of Noise feat. Tom Jones (3:30)

Dan Aykroyd and Kim Basinger performed impressions of Jimmy Durante from The Man Who Came to Dinner singing "Did You Ever Have the Feeling" in My Stepmother Is an Alien.

Release 
A July press release for the film stated that My Stepmother Is An Alien would be released on November 23, 1988, but it was later pushed to December 9. The film premiered on December 3, 1988, in Washington, D.C., an event attended by stars Aykroyd and Basinger, as well as President George H. W. Bush, First Lady Barbara Bush and Vice President Dan Quayle. Upon general release, Mayor of Los Angeles Tom Bradley declared December 9 “Stepmother Day”, to honor the “importance, dedication, and contribution of stepmothers everywhere”, and an appreciation of the film shooting in Los Angeles.

Reception

Box office
The film opened at number seven, grossing $2,066,980 in the opening weekend. It went on to gross $13,854,000 in the United States, becoming a box-office failure.

Critical response

The film was met with negative reviews. Roger Ebert wrote, "Basinger gets most of the good comic moments in the movie and does with them what she can, but Benjamin and his writers seem to have run short of invention. Most of the plot developments are foregone conclusions, and most of the big set pieces (like a wedding) are handled routinely, without inspiration." Janet Maslin, reviewing the film for The New York Times, panned the film's screenplay and humor, as well as the performance of Dan Aykroyd, who she felt was not only miscast as the film's romantic lead, but also unfunny. However, Maslin praised the performances of Kim Basinger and Jon Lovitz, whose character she categorized as a "scene-stealing sleazeball".

In a generally favorable review, the Los Angeles Times criticized the film's sex humor, calling it "needlessly crass", but overall praised the film, writing, "My Stepmother Is an Alien is solid, wide-appeal holiday fare. It makes the best use of Aykroyd's warmth and proven talents in quite some time, and it does even more for Basinger, showing that she can be as funny and smart as she is sexy." The Radio Times gave the film three out of five stars, writing, "Fine moments of inspired lunacy jostle with predictably slight comic relief, but Basinger's eager-to-please freshness and verve make this intergalactic muddle impossible to dislike."

Variety called the film a "failed attempt to mix many of the film genres associated with the 'alien' idea into a sprightly romp. TV Guide gave the film one star, calling it "A standard formula comedy [which] tries to emulate popular alien-on-Earth films like Starman. Had it actually been told from the perspective of the scientist's daughter, as the title suggests, it might have been more appealing, but instead a predictable, amateurish script shifts the focus elsewhere." People said that director Richard Benjamin "tries to disguise the threadbare plot with explosions and special-effects hardware", and called the film "a clanking bore, except for Basinger—a potential star still waiting for the vehicle that will let her shine. Her comic talent glimmers in a scene where she learns what a kiss is". Time Out wrote, "The film offers several entertaining sequences, [but My Stepmother Is an Alien] is marred by cruel and juvenile gags."

On Rotten Tomatoes, the film has a score of 20% based on reviews from 25 critics, with an average rating of 4/10. The consensus states: "Kim Basinger is otherworldly funny in this harebrained sci-fi rom com, but she still can't save My Stepmother Is an Alien from alienating intelligent earthlings." On Metacritic, the film has a weighted average score of 47 out of 100 based on 14 critics, indicating "mixed or average reviews". Audiences surveyed by CinemaScore gave the film a grade "B−" on scale of A to F.

Namesake
A South Korean branch of Baskin-Robbins released an ice cream flavor called "Mom is an alien" named after the movie.

See also
 List of films featuring extraterrestrials

References

Sources

External links 
 
 
 
 

1988 films
1980s science fiction comedy films
1988 independent films
American science fiction comedy films
American independent films
Columbia Pictures films
Films about extraterrestrial life
Films about families
Films about remarriage
Films about scientists
Films about widowhood
Films directed by Richard Benjamin
Films scored by Alan Silvestri
Films with screenplays by Timothy Harris (writer)
Films with screenplays by Herschel Weingrod
Weintraub Entertainment Group films
1980s English-language films
1980s American films